The King of Queens is an American television sitcom that originally aired on CBS from September 21, 1998, to May 14, 2007. The series spanned nine seasons, with a total of 207 episodes produced.

Series overview

Episodes

Season 1 (1998–99)

Season 2 (1999–2000)

Season 3 (2000–01)

Season 4 (2001–02)

Season 5 (2002–03)

Season 6 (2003–04)

Season 7 (2004–05)

Season 8 (2005–06)

Season 9 (2006–07)

References

External links
  from Sony Pictures
 

Lists of American sitcom episodes